The Motorola affair was an incident that resulted in the resignation of South Australian Premier John Olsen on 22 October 2001. Olsen's resignation came after the release of the Clayton Report, which stated that he had given "misleading, inaccurate and dishonest evidence to a judicial inquiry".

History
Following the 1983 Ash Wednesday bushfires in South Australia, it was found that the state's emergency services radio network needed significant improvement. A whole-of-government network was later recommended. In mid-1993, consultants suggested that Motorola technology would be most suited for the government radio network.

Separate to the government radio network, in 1994, Olsen, the state's industry minister at the time, signed a deal with Motorola to establish a software centre in Adelaide. Later in parliament, Olsen claimed he did not discuss with Motorola about the government radio network contract. Two years later, in November 1996, Olsen became Premier and announced Motorola was the preferred supplier for the government radio network.

In 1998, it was alleged that during the 1994 software centre deal, Olsen promised Motorola preferential treatment for the government radio contract. This led to a judiciary inquiry into the deal, which investigated if Olsen had misled Parliament over the contract. The report from the inquiry prepared by former chief magistrate Jim Cramond cleared Olsen of any wrongdoing.

In February 2001, opposition frontbencher Pat Conlon revealed leaked documents he claimed were withheld from the Cramond inquiry. This led to suspicion that the documents from the inquiry were deliberately withheld. In March, Olsen appointed Dean Clayton QC to look into the 1998 inquiry. The report, named Clayton Report, was released in October which stated that Olsen had given "misleading, inaccurate and dishonest evidence" to the judicial inquiry. The report also found that former Government adviser Alex Kennedy and the former head of his Department of Industry and Trade also "gave false evidence to the same inquiry".

In the days following the findings, there was growing speculation that Olsen would either resign or face a leadership spill within his own party. He ended up fronting the media and was steadfast in his own defence saying the report that he set up was wrong and handed out copies of his own 48 page response. Olsen stated "It says amongst other things that I, in answers to Mr Cramond, was misleading, inaccurate and dishonest. I was not and I absolutely refute Mr Clayton's assertion. The report clearly indicates there are no criminal activities, no illegal activities", and again backed the Motorola deal that was done. However, he went on to say he was "a political realist and for that reason I intend to offer my resignation to my Party as Premier of this State". He said he intended to seek further legal advice and continue to defend his integrity.

Olsen was replaced as leader and premier by Rob Kerin on 22 October 2001.

References

Political scandals in Australia
Motorola
2001 in Australia
Politics of South Australia
2000s in South Australia
2001 controversies
2001 in politics